On 11 August 2014, a six-story building under construction in the U Place Condotel condominium project, collapsed in Pathum Thani province, Thailand. The collapse resulted in 14 deaths and 25 injuries to the construction workers working on the building.

Background 

The collapse building was part of a six building project, including two finished buildings with residents. The building project is owned by Plook Plang Co. Ltd.

Aftermath 

Casualties included Cambodian nationals who were construction workers. The rescue operation was concluded on 14 August 2014, after all victims were found.

Cause 

A flaw in the construction design was cited as the cause for collapse. Columns at the perimeter of the building were not strong enough to support the weight of cement being poured on the roof, leading to a structural failure.

See also 
Collapse of the Royal Plaza Hotel

References

Pathum Thani building collapse
Building collapses in Thailand
Pathum Thani building collapse
Pathum Thani building collapse
Pathum Thani building collapse
Pathum Thani province